
Gmina Wartkowice is a rural gmina (administrative district) in Poddębice County, Łódź Voivodeship, in central Poland.

Villages
Gmina Wartkowice contains the villages and settlements of Biała Góra, Biernacice, Borek, Bronów, Bronówek, Brudnówek, Chodów, Drwalew, Dzierżawy, Grabiszew, Jadwisin, Kiki, Kłódno, Konopnica, Krzepocinek, Łążki, Lewiny, Mrówna, Nasale, Ner, Nowa Wieś, Nowy Gostków, Orzeszków, Parądzice, Pauzew, Pełczyska, Plewnik Drugi, Plewnik Pierwszy, Polesie, Powodów Drugi, Powodów Pierwszy, Powodów Trzeci, Saków, Sędów, Spędoszyn, Spędoszyn-Kolonia, Stary Gostków, Starzyny, Sucha Dolna, Sucha Górna, Światonia, Truskawiec, Tur, Ujazd, Wartkowice, Wierzbowa, Wierzbówka, Wilkowice, Wola Niedźwiedzia, Wola-Dąbrowa, Wólka, Wólki, Zacisze, Zalesie, Zawada and Zelgoszcz.

Neighbouring gminas
Gmina Wartkowice is bordered by the gminas of Dalików, Łęczyca, Parzęczew, Poddębice, Świnice Warckie and Uniejów.

References
 Polish official population figures 2006

Wartkowice
Poddębice County